Kenneth Passingham is a British film writer, biographer and critic. In the 1960s, he was a critic for Daily Sketch. He is the author of a biography of Sean Connery, first published in 1983, and authored a biography of Shirley Bassey in 1976. He also contributed to The Guinness Book of TV Facts and Feats in 1984.

References

English biographers
British film historians
English film critics
Year of birth missing (living people)
Living people